The following is a list of the first woman to serve as mayor of their respective municipalities.

2000s
2000
Lore Christopher, first woman elected mayor of Keizer, Oregon, United States (2001–2014) 
Alison Grosse first woman elected mayor of the Shire of Maroochy, Queensland, Australia 

2001
Izalene Tiene, first woman elected mayor of Campinas, Brazil (2001–2004) 
Yvonne Brown, first black woman elected mayor of Tchula, Mississippi, United States 
first black Republican woman elected mayor in the state of Mississippi
Martine Aubry, first woman elected mayor of Lille, France 
Berta Cabral, first woman elected mayor of Ponta Delgada, Azores, Portugal 
Lauren Fortmiller, first woman elected mayor of Sag Harbor, New York, United States 
also the first lesbian mayor of Sag Harbor
Rhine McLin, first woman elected mayor of Dayton, Ohio, United States 
Shirley Franklin, first woman and black woman elected mayor of Atlanta, Georgia, United States 
Jane Leaver, first woman elected mayor of Medina, Ohio, United States 
Ellen O. Moyer, first woman elected mayor of Annapolis, Maryland, United States 
Dubravka Šuica, first woman elected mayor of Dubrovnik, Croatia 
Rosa Russo Iervolino, first woman elected mayor of Naples, Italy 
Ophelia Hoff Saytumah, first woman elected mayor of Monrovia, Liberia 
Sandra Strader, first woman elected mayor of Tupper Lake, New York, United States 

2002
Dora Bakoyannis, first woman elected mayor of Athens, Greece 
Annika Billström, first woman elected mayor of Stockholm, Sweden 
Jane L. Campbell, first woman elected mayor of Cleveland, Ohio, United States  
Brigitte Fouré, first woman elected mayor of Amiens, France 
Sekesai Makwavarara, first woman deputy mayor of Harare, Zimbabwe 
Nancy Merse, first woman mayor of Edgewater, New Jersey, United States 
Danica Simšič, first woman elected mayor of Ljubljana, Slovenia 
Hilde Zach, first woman elected mayor of Innsbruck, Austria 
Lou Ann Christensen, first woman elected mayor of Brigham City, Utah, United States 

2003

Catalina Cirer, first woman mayor of Palma de Mallorca, Spain 
Asma Chaabi, first female mayor of Essaouira, and the first woman elected mayor in Morocco 
Rosina Hoebes, first woman elected mayor of Swakopmund, Namibia 
Laine Jänes, first woman mayor of Tartu, Estonia 
Josefa Luzardo, first woman mayor of Las Palmas, Spain 
Valentina Matviyenko, first woman mayor of Saint Petersburg, Russia 
Aneesa Mirza, the first woman elected mayor of Ahmedabad, India 
also the first woman of Muslim faith elected mayor in India
Manorama Sharma, first woman mayor of Dehradun, India 
Carolyn Terteling-Payne, first woman Mayor of Boise, Idaho, United States 
Rose Garland Thornton, first woman mayor pro tem of Grosse Pointe Shores, Michigan 
Lucy Turnbull, first woman Lord Mayor of Sydney, Australia 
Joan Vinton, first woman mayor of Shellharbour, New South Wales, Australia 
Vinton served as interim mayor and was defeated in an election in December 2003 by deputy mayor David Hamilton.
Angelika Volquartz, first woman mayor of Kiel, Germany 

2004
Deborah Cantwell, first woman elected mayor of Lawrence, Indiana, United States 
also the first Democrat to be elected mayor in Lawrence
Maja Gojković, first woman mayor of Novi Sad, Serbia 
Aminata Thiam, probably the first woman mayor of Dakkar, Senegal 
Oumou Sall Seck, first woman mayor of Goundam, Mali 
Dianna Freelon-Foster, the first woman and first African-American mayor of Grenada, Mississippi, United States 

2005
Kim Driscoll, first woman elected mayor of Salem, Massachusetts, United States 
Semiha Borovac, first woman mayor of Sarajevo, Bosnia and Herzegovina 
Marija-Maja Ćatović, first woman mayor of Kotor and first female mayor in Montenegro 
Andrée Boucher, first woman elected mayor of Quebec City, Quebec, Canada 
Dianne Watts, first woman elected mayor of Surrey, British Columbia, Canada 
Janet Mikhail, first woman mayor of Ramallah, Palestine 
also the first woman mayor of a West Bank town
Violeta Menjívar, first woman mayor of San Salvador, El Salvador 
Mercy Williams, first woman mayor of Kochi, India 
Prof. R Bindhu, first woman mayor of Thrissur, India 
Sheriel F. Perkins, first woman and African American elected mayor of Greenwood, Mississippi, United States 
Theresa Murray, first woman mayor of Poplar, Montana, United States 

2006
Patricia Christensen, first woman elected mayor of Port St. Lucie, Florida, United States 
Eleni Mavrou, first woman elected mayor of Nicosia, Cyprus 
Ritt Bjerregaard, first woman mayor of Copenhagen, Denmark 
Letizia Moratti, first woman elected mayor of Milan, Italy 
Zenaida Moya, first woman elected mayor of Belize City, Belize 
Hanna Gronkiewicz-Waltz, first woman elected mayor of Warsaw, Poland 
Olga Velazquez, first woman elected mayor of Portage, Indiana, United States 
Margaret Hornady, first woman elected mayor of Grand Island, Nebraska, United States 
Aissa Kirabo Kakira, first woman elected mayor of Kigali, Rwanda 

2007
Rita Ellis, first woman elected mayor of Delray Beach, Florida, United States 
Chen Wei, first woman elected mayor of Pingliang, China 
Donnalee Lozeau, first woman elected mayor of Nashua, New Hampshire, United States 
April Capone Almon, first woman elected mayor of East Haven, Connecticut, United States 
Matti Herrera Bower, first woman elected mayor of Miami Beach, Florida, United States 
Sheila Dixon, first black woman elected mayor of Baltimore, Maryland, United States 
Barbara Ewing, first female Democrat elected mayor of Tell City, Indiana, United States 
Susan M. Kay, first woman elected mayor of Weymouth, Massachusetts, United States 
Shawna M. Gurgis, first woman elected mayor of Bedford, Indiana
Lisa Scaffidi, first woman elected mayor of Perth, Australia 
Katrina Shimbulu, first woman mayor of Oshakati, Namibia 
Marta Vincenzi, first woman elected mayor of Genoa, Italy 
Mónica Fein, first woman elected mayor of Rosario, Argentina 
Aurora Villamayor, first woman elected mayor of Angono, Rizal, Philippines 

2008
Sylviana Murni, first woman appointed mayor of Central Jakarta, Indonesia  
Elise Partin, first woman elected mayor of Cayce, South Carolina, United States 
Alys Lawson, first woman elected mayor of Conway, South Carolina, United States 
Pam Lee, first woman elected mayor of Mullins, South Carolina, United States 
Mimi Elrod, first woman elected mayor of Lexington, Virginia, United States 
Patricia Sweetland, first woman mayor of Adams, New York, United States 
Jeanne-Marie Napolitano, first woman mayor of Newport, Rhode Island, United States 
Mary Rossing, first woman elected mayor of Northfield, Minnesota, United States 
Nancy Tia Brown, first woman elected mayor of Cody, Wyoming, United States 
Wilda Diaz, first woman elected mayor of Perth Amboy, New Jersey, United States 
Linda Johnson, first woman elected mayor of Suffolk, Virginia, United States 
Jetta Klijnsma, first woman mayor of The Hague, Netherlands 
Helma Orosz, first woman elected mayor of Dresden, Germany 
Blanca Alcalá, first woman elected mayor of Pueblo, Mexico 
Sonia Castedo, first woman mayor of Alicante, Spain 
Azra Jafari, first woman appointed mayor of Nili and first woman mayor in Afghanistan 
Eva Habil, first woman elected mayor of Komboha and first woman mayor in Egypt 

2009
Cheri Barry, first woman elected mayor of Meridian, Mississippi, United States 
Maria Teresa Beccari, first woman elected mayor of City of San Marino 
Donna McFadden-Connors, first woman appointed mayor of Pittston, Pennsylvania, United States 
Yordanka Fandakova, first woman elected mayor of Sofia, Bulgaria 
Fumiko Hayashi, first woman elected mayor of Yokohama, Japan 
Melissa Johnson, first woman elected mayor of West Jordan, Utah, United States 
Jyoti Khandelwal, first woman mayor of Jaipur, India 
Mia Love, first woman elected mayor Saratoga Springs, Utah and first black woman mayor in Utah
Corine Mauch, first woman elected mayor of Zurich, Switzerland 
Stephanie Miner, first woman elected mayor of Syracuse, New York, United States 
Natasha Navas, first woman elected mayor of Chaguanas, Trinidad and Tobago 
Banda Karthika Reddy, first woman elected mayor of Hyderabad, India 
Linda Thompson, first woman elected mayor of Harrisburg, Pennsylvania, United States 
also the first African American mayor of Harrisburg
Kimiko Kubota, first woman mayor of Ube, Yamaguchi, Japan

2010s 

2010
Debbie Amaroso, first woman elected mayor of Sault Ste. Marie, Ontario, Canada 
Patricia Ayala, first woman elected mayor of Artigas, Uruguay 
Sara Duterte, first woman elected Mayor of Davao City, Philippines 
Shari Decter Hirst, first woman elected mayor of Brandon, Manitoba, Canada 
Kazumi Inamura, first woman mayor of Amagasaki, Japan 
Patahiyah Ismail, first woman municipal council president of Penang Island, Malaysia 
Katarína Macháčková, first woman mayor of Prievidza, Slovakia 
Selma Nelumbu, first woman mayor of Omaruru, Namibia 
Ana Olivera, first woman elected mayor of Montevideo, Uruguay 
Adriana Peña, first woman elected mayor of Lavalleja, Uruguay 
Elaine Trepper, first black woman mayor of Windhoek, Namibia 
Hanna Zdanowska, first woman elected mayor of Łódź, Poland 
Tri Rismaharini, first woman elected mayor of Surabaya, Indonesia 

2011
Ana Botella, first woman designated mayor of Madrid, Spain 
Charlotte Brower, first woman elected mayor of North Slope Borough, Alaska, United States 
Joyce Chepkoech Korir, first woman elected mayor of Bomet, Kenya 
Adelina Farici, first woman elected mayor of Burrel, Albania 
Karen Freeman-Wilson, first woman elected mayor of Gary, Indiana, United States 
also first African-American woman elected mayor in the State of Indiana
Salina Hayat Ivy, first woman elected mayor of Narayanganj, Bangladesh 
Grace Mahosi, first woman elected mayor of Thulamela, Limpopo, South Africa 
Lilian Osundwa, first woman elected mayor of Mumias, Kenya 
Madeline Rogero, first woman elected mayor of Knoxville, Tennessee, United States 
Laura Roughton, first woman elected mayor of Jurupa Valley, California, United States 
also first mayor of Jurupa Valley, California
Teresa Tomlinson, first woman elected mayor of Columbus, Georgia, United States 
Jean Quan, first woman elected mayor of Oakland, California, United States 
also the first Asian American mayor of Oakland
Mercy Wanjiku Kimwe, first woman elected mayor of Muranga, Kenya 

2012
Joanna Gash, first woman elected mayor of Shoalhaven, Australia 
Jodie Harrison, first woman elected mayor of Lake Macquarie, Australia 
Halyna Hereha, first woman appointed mayor of Kyiv, Ukraine 
Naomi Koshi, first woman elected mayor of Ōtsu, Japan 
Frances Ann Romero, first woman elected mayor of Guadalupe, California, United States 
Kelli Linville, first woman elected mayor of Bellingham, Washington, United States 
Margarita Arellanes Cervantes, first woman elected mayor of Monterrey, Mexico 
Vera Baboun, first woman elected mayor of Bethlehem, Palestine 
Dorothy Hubbard, first woman elected mayor of Albany, Georgia, United States 

2013
Trish Abato, first woman elected mayor of Suffern, New York, United States 
Alinah Ahmad, first woman mayor of Petaling Jaya, Malaysia 
Priscilla Arhin, probably the first woman elected mayor of Cape Coast, Ghana 
Teuta Arifi, first woman elected mayor of Tetovo, Macedonia 
Mary Ann Arnold, first woman elected mayor of Marked Tree, Arkansas, United States 
Karen Cadieux, first woman mayor of Easthampton, Massachusetts 
Dorine Chukowry, first woman elected mayor of Port Louis, Mauritius 
Renu Dabla, first woman elected mayor of Rohtak, India 
Agnes Delgado-Tolentino, first woman elected mayor of Tagaytay, Philippines 
Anita Dugatto, first woman elected mayor of Derby, Connecticut, United States 
Belen Fernandez, first woman elected mayor of Dagupan, Philippines 
Toni Harp, first woman elected mayor, and first female African-American mayor of New Haven, Connecticut, United States 
Ashley Hennings, first woman elected mayor of Newport, New York, United States 
Deb Hinchey, first woman elected mayor of Norwich, Connecticut, United States 
Stacey Jordan, first woman elected mayor of Moorestown, New Jersey, United States 
Cecilia Oba Tito, first woman elected mayor of Yei, South Sudan and also the first female mayor in South Sudan 
Catherine Samba-Panza, probably the first woman elected mayor of Bangui, Central African Republic 
Kathy Sheehan, first woman elected mayor of Albany, New York, United States 
Katrin Stjernfeldt Jammeh, first woman elected mayor of Malmö, Sweden 
Jean Stothert, first woman elected mayor of Omaha, Nebraska, United States 
Olga Rasamimanana, first woman elected mayor of Antananarivo, Madagascar 
Stephanie Uy-Tan, first woman elected mayor of Catbalogan, Philippines 
Lovely Warren, first woman elected mayor, and first African-American woman mayor of Rochester, New York, United States 
Del Rae Williams, first woman elected mayor of Moorhead, Minnesota, United States 
Diana Willits, first woman elected mayor of Windsor Heights, Iowa, United States 
Maile Wilson, first woman elected mayor of Cedar City, Utah, United States 

2014

Katari Anuradha, first woman mayor of Chittoor, India 
Lourdes "Baby" S. Cataquiz, first woman elected mayor of San Pedro, Laguna, Philippines 
Maty Mint Hamady, first woman elected mayor of Nouakchott, Mauritania 
Anne Hidalgo, first woman elected Mayor of Paris, France 
Mimoza Kusari-Lila, first woman elected mayor of Gjakova, Kosovo 
Johanna Rolland, first woman elected mayor of Nantes, France 
Lisa Helps, first woman elected mayor of Victoria, British Columbia, Canada 
Gültan Kışanak, first woman elected mayor of Diyarbakır, Turkey 
Joana Ntaja, first woman elected mayor of Zomba, Malawi 
Celeste Sanchez, first woman elected mayor of San Benito, Texas, United States 
Tana Raymond, first woman elected mayor of Garfield, New Jersey, United States 
Mayra Peña Lindsay, first woman mayor of Key Biscayne, Florida, United States 
Adriana Krnáčová, first woman elected mayor of Prague, Czech Republic 
Sylvia Muzila, first woman elected mayor of Francistown, Botswana 
Shaik Noorjahan, first woman elected mayor of Eluru, Andhra Pradesh, India 
Andrea Turčanová, first woman elected mayor of Prešov, Slovakia 
Louise Carter-King, first woman elected mayor of Gillette, Wyoming, United States 
Marian Tudela, first woman mayor of Saipan, Northern Mariana Islands 
Liesbeth Spies, first woman mayor of Alphen aan den Rijn, Netherlands  (since 15 December 2014)

2015
Gail Ash, first woman elected mayor of Clermont, Florida, United States 
Dr. Zekra Alwach, first woman mayor of Baghdad, Iraq 
Megan Barry, first woman elected mayor of Nashville, Tennessee, United States 
Manuela Carmena, first woman elected mayor of Madrid, Spain 
Ada Colau, first woman elected mayor of Barcelona, Spain 
Christine Dansereau, first woman elected mayor of Roselle, New Jersey, United States 
Patahiyah Ismail, first woman mayor of Penang Island, Malaysia 
Laura Hill, first woman elected mayor of Southlake, Texas, United States 
Henriette Reker, first woman elected mayor of Cologne, Germany 
Pravina Thakur, first woman elected mayor of Vasai-Virar, India 
Karen Weaver, PhD, first woman elected mayor of Flint, Michigan, United States 

2016
Gabriela Firea, first woman elected mayor of Bucharest, Romania 
Lani Mercado, first woman elected Mayor of Bacoor, Philippines 
Virginia Raggi, first woman elected mayor of Rome, Italy 
Yuriko Koike, first woman elected governor of Tokyo, Japan 
Milissa Holland, first woman elected mayor of Palm Coast, Florida, United States 
Lily Mei, first woman elected mayor of Fremont, California, United States 
Marian Orr, first woman elected mayor of Cheyenne, Wyoming, United States 
Maimunah Mohd Sharif, first woman municipal council president of Seberang Perai, Malaysia 
Rosalynn Bliss, first woman elected as mayor of Grand Rapids, Michigan, United States 
Michelle Roman, first woman elected as Mayor of Kingsburg, California, United States 

2017
Loretta Baker, first woman elected mayor of Maitland, New South Wales, Australia 
Sanyukta Bhatia, first woman elected mayor of Lucknow, India 
Sharon Weston Broome first woman elected as Mayor-President of Baton Rouge, Louisiana, United States 
Tasha Cerda, first woman to be elected Mayor of Gardena, California, United States 
Also the first person of either African American and Native American descent to be elected mayor of Gardena and the first person of Native American descent to be elected mayor in the state of California.
Tjhai Chui Mie, first woman elected mayor of Singkawang, Indonesia 
Joyce Craig, first woman elected mayor of Manchester, New Hampshire, United States 
Ruthanne Fuller, first woman elected mayor of Newton, Massachusetts, United States 
Lyda Krewson, first woman elected mayor of Saint Louis, Missouri, United States 
Diane Langman, first woman elected mayor of Warfield, British Columbia, Canada 
Anne McEnerny-Ogle, first woman elected mayor of Vancouver, Washington, United States 
Valérie Plante, first woman elected mayor of Montreal, Quebec, Canada 
Yvonne M. Spicer, first woman elected mayor of Framingham, Massachusetts, United States 
Lynn Spruill, first woman elected mayor of Starkville, Mississippi, United States .
Cassie Franklin, first woman elected Mayor of Everett, Washington, United States 
Carol Westfall, first woman elected mayor of Klamath Falls, Oregon, United States 

2018

Latoya Cantrell, first woman elected mayor of New Orleans, Louisiana (since 7 May 2018) 
Souad Abderrahim, first woman mayor of Tunis, Tunisia in its first local election (since 3 July 2018) 
Femke Halsema, first woman elected mayor of Amsterdam, Netherlands (since 12 July 2018) 
Einat Kalisch-Rotem, first woman elected mayor of Haifa, Israel (since 20 November 2018)   see: 2018 Haifa mayoral election
Lisa Pasin, first woman elected mayor of Trail, British Columbia, Canada 
Claudia Sheinbaum, first woman elected mayor of Mexico City, Mexico (since 5 December 2018)  

2019
Aleksandra Dulkiewicz, first woman mayor of Gdańsk, Poland (since 11 March 2019)   
Claudia López, first woman elected mayor of Bogotá, Colombia (since 27 October 2019)  
Juliana Kaduya, first female mayor of Lilongwe City Council, Malawi (2019 - 2021) 
Safiya Hassan Sheikh Ali Jimale, Mayor of Beledweyne, first woman mayor in Somalia (since 2019)

2020s
2020
Ella Jones, first woman and elected mayor of Ferguson, Missouri 
also the first African American woman elected mayor
Michèle Rubirola, first woman mayor of Marseille, France 
Saleema McCree Thomas, first woman elected mayor of Point Fortin, Trinidad and Tobago (since 26 August 2020).
The city of Nawabs, Lucknow, Uttar Pradesh, India, will elect its first-ever woman mayor.

2021
Kim Janey, acting mayor of Boston
First Black mayor of Boston
Michelle Wu, first woman elected mayor of Boston
First Asian mayor of Boston

2022
Honey Lacuna, first woman mayor of Manila, Philippines 
Maila Ting-Que, first woman mayor of Tuguegarao City, Philippines

See also 

 List of first women governors and/or chief ministers
 List of first women mayors
 List of first women mayors (18th and 19th centuries)
 List of first women mayors (20th century)
 List of first women mayors in the United States
 List of the first female holders of political offices
 Women in government

References

Lists of mayors
Mayors
Lists of women politicians
21st